Luana Zajmi (born 29 January 2002) is a Slovenian professional footballer who plays as a midfielder for Split.

International career
Between 2017 and 2019, Zajmi has been part of Slovenia at youth international level, playing for the under-17 and under-19 sides. On 20 February 2021, Zajmi received a call-up from Albania for a seven-day training camp in Ulcinj.

Honours
Pomurje
Slovenian Women's League: 2020–21
Slovenian Women's Cup runner-up: 2020–21

References

External links

2002 births
Living people
Slovenian women's footballers
Slovenian people of Albanian descent
Women's association football midfielders
ŽNK Mura players
Leicester City W.F.C. players
Blackburn Rovers L.F.C. players
ŽNK Split players
Slovenia women's international footballers
Slovenian expatriate footballers
Expatriate women's footballers in England
Slovenian expatriate sportspeople in England
Expatriate women's footballers in Croatia
Slovenian expatriate sportspeople in Croatia